Jacques Deschenaux (born 9 December 1945 in Fribourg) is a Swiss journalist and television personality.

He has worked for many years with the sports programming at the French branch of Swiss television. Among his journalistic works is a biography of Swiss racing driver Jo Siffert. In 1989 he co-hosted the Eurovision Song Contest with Lolita Morena.

See also
 List of Eurovision Song Contest presenters

References

1945 births
Living people
People from Fribourg
Swiss television journalists